Lindsay Burdette (born February 26, 1988) is an American former professional tennis player.

Burdette, the middle sister of tennis players Erin and Mallory, was born in Macon, Georgia. She only featured in the occasional professional tournament, but appeared twice in the US Open doubles main draw, partnering sister Mallory in 2006 and college teammate Hilary Barte in 2010.

While playing for the Stanford Cardinal she formed a successful doubles partnership with Hilary Barte, which earned them the 2010 NCAA Division I doubles championship, following a runner-up finish the previous season.

References

External links
 
 

1988 births
Living people
American female tennis players
Stanford Cardinal women's tennis players
Tennis people from Georgia (U.S. state)
Sportspeople from Macon, Georgia